Mr Blobby is a character originally featured on the British Saturday night variety show Noel's House Party, broadcast on BBC One. Created by Charlie Adams, a writer for the show, Mr Blobby is a bulbous pink figure covered in yellow spots, with a permanent toothy grin and green jiggling eyes. Mr Blobby communicates only by saying the word "blobby" in an electronically altered voice, expressing his moods through tone of voice and repetition. He topped the UK Singles Chart with the 1993 Christmas release "Mr Blobby".

The legal rights to the character are owned by BBC Studios and Unique Television Ltd., a company founded by the presenter Noel Edmonds.

History

Origins 
Mr Blobby first appeared in 1992 in the 'Gotcha' segment of the second series of Noel's House Party, in which celebrities were caught out in a Candid Camera style prank. Mr Blobby was presented to the celebrities as if he were a real and established children's television character, in order to record a feature about the guests' professions - in reality, the setup was completely fictitious, and the character of Mr Blobby portrayed by Noel Edmonds and focused on acting childish and unprofessionally to irritate the celebrities taking part. After the conclusion of the second series, the character was made a regular feature of the programme, with the production team taking turns to don the costume created by artist Joshua Snow.

Through Noel's House Party, Mr Blobby was seen in short comedy sketches, 'guest-appearing' on other TV programmes. Examples include Lovejoy, where he unintentionally broke antique furniture, and Keeping Up Appearances, where he was seen paying an impromptu visit to Hyacinth and Richard Bucket, disrupting their kitchen. Mr Blobby was later dropped from Noel's House Party for its final series, but was later brought back for the programme's final episode.

Other appearances 
Mr Blobby made regular appearances on Saturday morning show Live & Kicking and Saturday evening show The Generation Game with Jim Davidson. The character has appeared in cameos on Dead Ringers, Harry Hill's TV Burp, Dick and Dom in da Bungalow and Ant & Dec's Saturday Night Takeaway. The character also appeared in the music video for Peter Kay's 2005 charity single "Is This the Way to Amarillo".

Mr Blobby was a regular character at the Danish adaption Greven på Hittegodset (1996) shown on TV 2 and was presented by Eddie Michel. The Danish adaption of Noel's House Party had negative reception from audiences, and was cancelled after only six of thirteen planned shows.

In December 1997, Mr Blobby made a guest appearance on the children's game show Get Your Own Back, he was the losing grown-up and was subsequently gunged. He made a return the following year this time playing a judge on the show and gunged presenter Dave Benson Phillips as revenge for the previous year.

Mr Blobby has toured around the UK making public appearances at events such as university balls and in pantomime, and has made short videos and sketches exclusively for his official YouTube channel.

John McLagan stood as "Mr Blobby" in the Littleborough and Saddleworth by-election in 1995, having changed his name by deed poll. He came seventh out of ten candidates, with 105 votes (0.2%).

In 2012 Mr Blobby made a guest appearance on the 23 September episode of The Big Fat Quiz of the Year "The Big Fat Quiz of the '90s".

In May 2017 Mr Blobby made a guest appearance in the "Ghostbusters" episode of The Keith & Paddy Picture Show, where he was portrayed by Paul Denson. He also appeared on The Last Leg, where he was declared as leader of "The 90s Party", a political party formed by the show's hosts.

On 14 October 2017, Mr Blobby made a guest appearance on Sam Delaney's News Thing.

In November 2018, during Noel Edmonds' appearance on the eighteenth series of I'm a Celebrity...Get Me Out of Here!, Mr Blobby made guest appearances on Loose Women and This Morning and was interviewed about Edmonds' time on the show.

In January and February 2019, Mr Blobby appeared in an advertising campaign celebrating the 100th birthday of supermarket Tesco.

On 6 September 2019, Mr Blobby appeared on the 20th Anniversary episode of Loose Women where he grappled Carol McGiffin, losing an eye in the process.

In November 2019, Mr Blobby appeared in Virgin Trains West Coast's "Final Whistle" music video, celebrating the end of the franchise.

On 7 November 2021, Mr Blobby attempted to take part in the Children in Need's Puppet Aid musical, but was locked out of the studio while the rest of Britain's famous puppets sang Starship's Nothing's Gonna Stop Us Now. He then, according to the video, three hours later, broke into the studio and delivered the final note.

From 4 December 2021, Mr Blobby starred in The Chrysalis Theatre, Milton Keynes' pantomime Peter Pan. The production ended prematurely due to the worsening COVID-19 conditions.

In September 2022, Mr Blobby appeared on The Big Breakfast and rode a mechanical bull. In November 2022, Mr Blobby appeared the celebrity call centre segment of Children in Need 2022.

In January 2023, Mr Blobby appeared on This Morning again, this time during a segment with Alice Beer where she discussed the eBay auction in which an unused original Mr Blobby costume had reached over £61,000.

In February 2023, Mr Blobby made a guest appearance on ITV’s ice-skating game show, Dancing on Ice.

Criticism 
In March 1994, Elizabeth Kolbert of The New York Times wrote: "Mr Blobby's rise to stardom has provoked anguished commentaries about just what he stands for... Some commentators have called him a metaphor for a nation gone soft in the head. Others have seen him as proof of Britain's deep-seated attraction to trash." A Sun article published the previous month had reported that Blobby reduced a young girl to tears after throwing her birthday cake onto the floor during a show in Luton, causing the girl's father to mount the stage and assault Blobby. Neville Crumpton, who owns the rights to the character, said: "If the press can knock him, they'll knock him whenever they can." A trio of failed Mr Blobby theme parks also resulted in considerable negative press and scandal.

On a 1996 episode of Never Mind the Buzzcocks, Bob Mortimer described Blobby as a "pink, spotty, rubber twat", to applause from the audience and other guests. Addressing the character's popularity, former longtime BBC employee Michael Parkinson in 2007 confessed that he "really didn't get it", and found Blobby "far from amusing". In February 2009, Cole Moreton of The Independent featured Blobby in a recounting of the "10 most irritating television characters", asking: "Was there something in the water? Did the nation really once fall about laughing at the clumsy antics of a bloke in a big pink rubber costume with yellow blobs all over it?" In a 2016 article, Stuart Heritage of The Guardian said that Blobby "became a sensation immediately", but then devolved into a "widely despised irritant".

Music career
Mr Blobby's 1993 Christmas release "Mr Blobby", which topped the UK Singles Chart for three weeks, is regarded by many as the worst single, and indeed, song, of all time. It beat Meat Loaf's "I'd Do Anything for Love (But I Won't Do That)," and Take That's "Babe", among other songs to Christmas number 1. His 1995 track "Christmas in Blobbyland" (a number 36 UK entry) was voted the worst festive song ever by British Christmas shoppers in 2011 and 2015 polls, and was named in a 2013 Metro article as the second-worst Christmas song of all time, being beaten by Destiny's Child's "A DC Christmas Medley". Mr Blobby: The Album (1994) was voted the worst LP ever made in a 2016 listener survey.

Toys and merchandising 
Around Christmas 1993, retailers came out with many types of Mr Blobby merchandise. In addition to the CD, 7" vinyl or cassette tape single, Blobby merchandise included dolls and plush toys, slippers, egg cups, condiment shakers, pink lemonade, and towels.

Three programs were released on VHS, "Mr Blobby" (1993), "Blobbyvision" (1994) and "The All New Adventures of Mr Blobby" (1996).

UK VHS and DVD releases

The Nutter Clutter Productions released the original Mr Blobby VHS on DVD in 2013.

Video game 

In 1994 Millennium Interactive released Mr Blobby, a platform game based on the character for Amiga and MS-DOS. The game received negative reviews from critics.

Theme parks 

Mr Blobby appeared at three Crinkley Bottom-themed attractions in pre-existing British theme parks during the 1990s. The first was based at Cricket St Thomas in Somerset, opening in July 1994. Attractions included a walk-through Blobby House named Dunblobbin, a dark ride based around classic children's television characters, and an animated Noddy exhibit. While the park attracted over 500,000 visitors in its first year, attendance figures dwindled and the park closed in 1998.

The second park was opened at Happy Mount Park, Morecambe, in 1994. This led to large losses, a local scandal toppling councillors and finally an auditor's investigation, which reported in 2004 that "the Council's decision to proceed with the Theme Park was, on the basis of information available to Members and officers in March 1994, imprudent and failed to give due regard to the interests of local taxpayers." The auditor noted "the failure of the Council to carry out market research, the failure to make informed estimates of likely attendance figures, the absence of a design concept, the absence of a detailed specification, the absence of an accurate financial forecast and the imprecise drafting of the Heads of Terms", concluding that "the Council entered into an open-ended commitment without knowing what it was going to get for local taxpayers' money." Council losses stood at £2.5 million. Unique successfully sued the council, whose activities were described as "imprudent, irrational and even unlawful", for £950,000.

A third park based in Pleasurewood Hills, Lowestoft also failed to outlive the 1990s but maintained successful revenue during and after the Crinkley Bottom branding.

Portrayers

Barry Killerby 
The original man in the Blobby suit, Barry Killerby, is a classically trained Shakespearean actor from Bradford, West Yorkshire. In 2008 he was working as a compere for an entertainment company. He commented that working as Mr Blobby was harder than it looks by saying "People think it's easy bouncing around saying, 'blobby', but they should try it. It was exhausting and demanding." Killerby's final appearance as Blobby was on The Big Fat Quiz of the Year in December 2012.

Paul Denson 
Following Killerby's retirement from the role, Paul Denson was asked if he would run the Mr Blobby YouTube channel and occasionally wear the suit to make video content. Denson, a child of the 90s, said he "thought it sounded like fun" and that it "was surreal putting on the suit for the first time." His first credited appearance as Blobby was on Alan Carr: Chatty Man in December 2016 and has appeared as the character ever since.

Filmography

References

External links 
 
 
 Mr Blobby dolls at bbc.co.uk
 mrblobbyofficial at facebook.com
 mrblobbytv at twitter.com
 Death of comedy writer Charlie Adams, creator of Mr Blobby

Television characters introduced in 1992
Blobby
1992 in British television
British novelty song performers
British television characters